Pipistrellus kuhlii coronavirus 3398 is a species of coronavirus in the genus Alphacoronavirus.

References

Alphacoronaviruses